Compaq SLT was a line of laptop computers made by Compaq. The SLT series was the successor to the Portable III and the predecessor to the more well known Compaq LTE. Two models were produced in the SLT series. The first model, named SLT/286, released on October 17, 1988, is considered to be one of the most notable units in laptop history due to its battery life and superior performance compared to competing models. It is also notable for being Compaq’s first laptop computer. The SLT/286 had a 12 MHz Harris or Intel 80C286 processor (both brands were used throughout the SLT/286’s production) and a grayscale (up to 8 shades) backlit VGA LCD screen, the very first laptop with this feature. The price started at $5,399 for the base-model.

The second model, the SLT 386s/20, was released in 1990, and featured a 386SX 20 MHz CPU, versus the 286 12 MHz CPU of the SLT/286. It also came with 2 MB of RAM standard (expandable to 14 MB), compared to the 640 KB (expandable to 12.6 MB) the SLT/286 came with, and a 60 or 120 MB hard disk drive, rather than the 20 or 40 MB options the SLT/286 offered.

Docking Station Capability
The SLT line was marketed as a desktop replacement and had a matching docking station, which allowed two standard ISA boards to be used with the SLT.

The docking station retailed for $999.

Models

Battery life
Compaq's main marketing message for the SLT range was its battery life, up to 3-hours minimum. Compaq mentioned this feature in almost all of the SLT literature. Moreover, Compaq released an external battery charger to enable the business user to charge up multiple batteries.

Clones

Victor Technologies offered a clone of the SLT/386 model, model Grid 386PX (BV30E01A). Whilst the Grid 386PX looks slightly different, it was unclear whether the Grid 386PX was a true clone or an alternative OEM product.

Acer also offered a clone, known as the AnyWare 1100LX.

References 

SLT
SLT
Computer-related introductions in 1988
Articles containing video clips